Atrophacanthus japonicus is a species of spikefish native to the Indian and western Pacific Oceans where it is found at depths of from .  This species grows to a length of  SL.  This species is the only known member of its genus.

References

Tetraodontiformes
Taxa named by Alec Fraser-Brunner
Monotypic marine fish genera
Monotypic ray-finned fish genera